The Bom Futuro National Forest is a national forest in the state of Rondônia, Brazil.
The forest has been subject to a massive invasion of loggers, ranchers and farmers.

Location

The Bom Futuro National Forest is divided between the municipalities of Buritis and Porto Velho, Rondônia.
It adjoins the Rio Pardo Environmental Protection Area to the south, the Jaci Paraná Extractive Reserve to the southwest and the Karitiana Indigenous Territory to the west.
The forest would be included in the proposed Western Amazon Ecological Corridor, connecting it to neighboring conservation units.

The forest holds the sources of tributaries of the Jamari River via the Candeias River, and of the Jaci Paraná River via the Rio Branco. 
The forest was relatively intact in 1995.
The original vegetation was mainly open submontane rainforest and dense submontane rainforest, with savanna/rainforest contact, open alluvial rainforest and pioneer alluvial formations.

Land invasion

From 2000 an invasion began first of loggers, then of squatters and land speculators, supported by local politicians.
The urban settlement of Rio Pardo developed inside the forest, with more than ten sawmills and with associations to promote allocation of land to farmers and ranchers.
The Brazilian Institute of Environment and Renewable Natural Resources (IBAMA) attempted to expel the invaders on at least two occasions, but was unsuccessful in part due to lack of funding from the headquarters of the agency.

By 2003 some sawmills had been closed, but Rio Pardo was now a normal settlement with shops, a gas station, hotel, telephones and other public services.
In April 2007 IBAMA listed 236 ranchers operating illegally in the forest, with about 18,600 cattle.

Legislative history 

It is administered by the Chico Mendes Institute for Biodiversity Conservation (ICMBio).
It is classed as IUCN protected area category VI (protected area with sustainable use of natural resources).
The objective is to support sustainable multiple use of forest resources, and scientific research with emphasis on methods for sustainable exploitation of native forests.

On 15 July 2009 a working group was created with the objective of solving the social and environmental problems caused by the illegal occupation of the forest.
Ordnance 3109 of 29 September 2009 authorized use of the national public security forces to support IBAMA in curbing deforestation.
The road linking the settlement of Rio Pardo to BR-364 was excluded, as was an area of  that had previously overlapped with the Karitiana Indigenous Territory..
Law 2894 created a program to compensate families relocated from the forest.
Ordnance 138 of 15 December 2014 created the consultative council for the forest.

Notes

Sources

National forests of Brazil
Protected areas of Rondônia
1988 establishments in Brazil